Spartan Stadium  (formerly College Field, Macklin Field, and Macklin Stadium), opened in 1923 in East Lansing, Michigan, United States.  It is primarily used for football, and is the home field of the Michigan State University Spartans.  After the addition of luxury boxes and club seating in 2004–2005, the capacity of the stadium grew from 72,027 to 75,005—though it has held more than 80,000 fans—making it the Big Ten's sixth largest stadium. It has been nicknamed "The Woodshed".

History

In the early 1920s, school officials decided to construct a new stadium to replace Old College Field. The resulting stadium—the lower half of the current stadium—was ready in the fall of 1923 with a capacity of 14,000.  Over the years, the stadium grew.  In 1936, the field's track was removed and permanent north and south endzone seating was added, increasing the seating capacity to 26,000. This expansion was built as a part of the Works Progress Administration, an agency created by the New Deal that employed Americans to carry out public works projects. The facility was dedicated as Macklin Field, named in honor of former coach John Macklin, who put Michigan State football on the map with a 29–5 record from 1911 to 1915 with victories over big-name programs such as Michigan, Notre Dame, Ohio State, Penn State, and Wisconsin.  

After admittance into the Big Ten in 1948, Michigan State increased stadium capacity to 51,000 and the field was renamed Macklin Stadium. With Spartan football attracting national attention under Clarence "Biggie" Munn and Hugh "Duffy" Daugherty, 9,000 seats were added in 1956. The following season, the east and west sides were double-decked, boosting the capacity to 76,000. That same season, the stadium received its current name, Spartan Stadium. The school installed permanent lights in 2017.

In 1969, TartanTurf replaced the natural grass field and a modern scoreboard was added in 1973. In 1978, AstroTurf replaced the TartanTurf. A new modern video scoreboard was added before the 1991 season. Renovations improving sight lines, field security, handicap access, and club seats in 1994 reduced Spartan Stadium's capacity to 72,027. New turf was also installed in the summer of 1994. In 1998, Spartan Stadium's sound system was upgraded, adding a 21' x 27' Mitsubishi Diamond Vision video board to the south end and a message board to the north end. Home to one of the top turfgrass research programs in the nation, Michigan State installed a natural grass field in 2002. The most recent expansion was completed in August 2005. A new press box, 24 luxury suites, and 862 club seats were constructed on the west side of Spartan Stadium.  This addition made Spartan Stadium the tallest building in East Lansing.

Homefield advantage
In 2010-12, the Spartans won 15 straight games in Spartan Stadium, recording the program's longest home streak since winning 19 straight from 1950 to 1953. Michigan State went undefeated at home in back-to-back seasons (2010 and 2011) including marquee wins over Wisconsin, Michigan, and Notre Dame, marking the first consecutive perfect home seasons since 1955–56.

Special events

Hockey
On October 6, 2001, a rink was constructed at the center of the stadium for Michigan State's season-opening game against archrival Michigan. Dubbed "The Cold War", 74,554 watched No. 1 nationally ranked Michigan State and No. 4 nationally ranked Michigan play to a 3–3 tie. Country artist Shannon Brown sang during the second intermission. For almost nine years, the "Cold War" game held the world record for the largest ice hockey crowd in history, before being surpassed by a 2010 game played at Michigan Stadium.

The game started a trend outdoor ice hockey games in large stadiums.

Concerts

Expansion
On September 3, 2005, Spartan Stadium unveiled an eight-story,  expansion which had been under construction since 2003. At a total cost of $64 million the project created:
24 luxury suites
800 club seats
The "Grand Entrance" featuring high ceilings, glass walls, marble floors and a new home for the original Spartan statue.
 luxury concourse
Office space for Career Services, University Advancement and the MSU Alumni Office.
Modern recruiting lounge
Upgraded stadium-wide bathroom and concourse renovations
An increase of 3,000 seats, bringing the total stadium capacity to 75,005.

The Stadium renovation was done under a joint venture of Clark Construction and Barton Malow Construction Company.

Video board renovation
On January 27, 2012, the Michigan State Board of Trustees voted for a Video Board Renovation and Audio Package upgrade. The cost of the renovation was $10 million. Features include:
One of a kind LED wall measuring 10'x450' spanning the North End zone Wall.
Two Auxiliary Video Boards in the North End zone to provide 1,654 SF of video area per board. 
One South End zone Video Board, the largest in the Big Ten Conference with 5,412 SF, surpassing current leader Minnesota (5,184 SF).
Video board was built and installed by Panasonic
Video, graphic, and content control system installed by Click Effects
Video replay (control) room built by Comprehensive Technical Group Atlanta

New Spartan Stadium Scoreboard

The new scoreboards were unveiled on August 31, 2012, when the Spartans defeated #24 Boise State 17–13. The game was the 12th night game in the history of Spartan Stadium.

Tailgating
Game days at Spartan Stadium provide opportunity for tailgating.  Popular locations include the tennis courts, "the rock", and around the MSU library area on north campus. Open alcohol is permitted on campus during tailgating hours,  with the exception of Munn field.

Traditions

"The Spartan Walk" – On the morning of each home game, the team completes a 10-minute walk from their hotel at the Kellogg Center, crossing the Red Cedar River, passing the Spartan Statue and finally into the stadium.  The sidewalks are lined with fans applauding and cheering "Go Green, Go White."
"Zeke the Wonder Dog" – East Lansing's favorite frisbee-catching dog, debuting in 1977 and reemerging as a tradition in 2001. Tryouts for a replacement are held when Zeke becomes unable to wow spectators at halftime.
"It's a beautiful day for football!" – Just before kickoff, the PA announcer gives the weather forecast and, with the help of the fans, declares that "it's a beautiful day for football!" This tradition takes place even during games played in poor weather.
300 – Introduced in 2007, clips from the movie 300 were added to the "Thunderstruck" introduction sequence. A clip of Spartan King Leonidas shouting, "Spartans! What is your profession?" is played whenever the opponent is in a third down situation. The crowd responds with an emphatic "Ha-Ooh! Ha-Ooh! Ha-Ooh!" while thrusting their fists in the air as if they were carrying spears like in the movie. This is very popular with the football team. On October 16, 2010, 300 star Gerard Butler attended the Spartans' homecoming game. At the beginning of the game Butler walked onto the field repeating the familiar call to fans.

Notable games
1951 – v. Notre Dame – No. 5 ranked Michigan State blanks No. 11 ranked Notre Dame 35–0 before a national audience on NBC. The dominant victory propels Spartan football into the national spotlight.
1953 – v. Michigan – Michigan State defeats Michigan for the first time in Spartan Stadium history 14–6 earning MSU a co-Big Ten championship and a trip to the Rose Bowl.
1966 – v. Notre Dame – "Game of the Century"  ending in 10–10 tie. ND was ranked No. 1 and MSU was ranked No. 2 for several weeks prior to the game.
1972 - v. Ohio State - unranked MSU (3-4-1) upset undefeated #4 ranked Ohio State, 19–12, spoiling the Buckeyes' hopes for an undefeated season and national title.
1974 – v. Ohio State – unranked MSU upset undefeated and No. 1 ranked Ohio State, 16–13, ruining the Buckeyes' national title hopes.
1987 - v. USC - On Labor Day night, unranked MSU knocks off #19 USC in a nationally televised season opener, 27–13. The Spartans would go on to win the Big Ten title and defeat USC in a rematch in the Rose Bowl, 20–17.
1987 – v. Michigan – Spartans defeat Michigan 17–11 for their first victory over the Wolverines in East Lansing since 1969.
1987 – v. Indiana – MSU defeated Indiana 27–3 to win the Big Ten title and earned their first Rose Bowl bid since the 1965 season.
1995 – v. Michigan – Tony Banks led an  drive and threw the winning touchdown to Nigea Carter with 1:24 left in the game to win 28–25 over No. 7 ranked Michigan.
1998 – v. Notre Dame – before a national ABC prime time audience the Spartans jumped out to a 42–3 halftime lead en route to a 45–23 win.
2000 – v. Notre Dame – Wide receiver Herb Haygood catches a 68-yard touchdown pass on 4th down late in the 4th quarter, lifting the (#20) Spartans past (#18) Notre Dame.
2001 – v. Michigan – Quarterback Jeff Smoker finds T. J. Duckett in the end zone on fourth down on the final play of the game in a 26–24 victory. A timekeeper controversy resulted in the game being named clockgate.
2004 – v. Wisconsin – Michigan State executed 2 fourth down goal line stands, and two 99-yard touchdown drives, to stun the 9–0 (#5) Badgers 49–14, ending their hopes of a national championship. The victory marked the 300th win at Spartan Stadium.
2007 – v. Penn State – Halfback Jehuu Caulcrick leads Spartans from a 17-point deficit to a 35–31 victory.  MSU scored on 4 of 5 second half possessions, ensuring a trip to their first bowl game since 2003.
2009 – v. Michigan – The Wolverines scored two late touchdowns to force overtime, the second with 2 seconds left in the fourth quarter. After Wolverine quarterback Tate Forcier was intercepted on Michigan's overtime possession, Spartan running back Larry Caper rushed 23 yards for a touchdown to lead Michigan State to 26–20 victory.
2010 – v. Notre Dame – Michigan State wins 34-31 when punter Aaron Bates threw to tight end Charlie Gantt on a fake field goal for the game-winning touchdown in overtime. The play was named "Little Giants."
2010 - v. Purdue - Trailing 28-13 after 3 quarters, the Spartans scored 22 points in the 4th quarter to beat the Boilermakers 35-31 and finish the season undefeated at home, with an 11-1 overall record.
2011 - v. Wisconsin - Keith Nichol catches a 44-yard Hail Mary pass from Kirk Cousins as time expires to defeat the undefeated and #5 ranked Badgers 37–31.
2013 - v. Michigan - Michigan State defeated Michigan 29–6, in which the Spartans defense handed the Wolverines their worst rushing yardage (-48) in school history.
2015 - v. Oregon - In the first Top 10 matchup at Spartan Stadium since 1966, the fifth ranked Spartans prevailed in a classic, 31–28. This game saw the fans "Stripe the Stadium" and surpass capacity, having over 76,500 fans in attendance. The win gave MSU their 5th win in last 6 attempts vs. Top 10 teams.
2021 - v. Michigan - The Spartans  played their arch-rivals in the first Top 10 matchup between the teams since 1964. Michigan State, projected to finish last in the Big Ten East in the preseason voting, was ranked 8th in the country and tied for first place in the Big Ten East. The Spartans had a 16 point comeback led by Heisman Trophy candidate, running back Kenneth Walker III, who ended the game with 5 touchdowns and 197 yards. MSU won 37-33, advancing the series to 10-4 since Mike Hart called the Spartans “little brother” and also made head coach Mel Tucker the first coach in school history to start 2-0 against Michigan during his career. This win allowed the team to reach 8-0 for the first time since 2015, when they won the Big Ten title and made the College Football Playoff. The stadium had over 76,500 attendees.

Gallery

See also
 List of NCAA Division I FBS football stadiums

References

External links

 

American football venues in Michigan
College football venues
Michigan State Spartans football
Outdoor ice hockey venues in the United States
Sports venues in Lansing, Michigan
Michigan State University campus
Event venues established in 1923
1923 establishments in Michigan